Walter Jeandel (25 April 1918 – 4 April 2012) was a French cross-country and Nordic combined skier who competed in the 1948 Winter Olympics.

References

1918 births
2012 deaths
French male cross-country skiers
French male Nordic combined skiers
Olympic cross-country skiers of France
Olympic Nordic combined skiers of France
Cross-country skiers at the 1948 Winter Olympics
Nordic combined skiers at the 1948 Winter Olympics